Liu Cuiqing 刘翠青 (born October 28, 1991) is a Chinese para-track and field athlete who competed at the 2016 Summer Paralympics in the T11/F11 100 metres, 200 metres, 400 metres and long jump. She bronze medaled in the 100 metres with a time of 11.99 seconds. She runs with guide Xu Donglin 徐冬林.

See also 
 China at the 2016 Summer Paralympics

References

External links 

 

1991 births
Living people
Paralympic competitors for China
Athletes (track and field) at the 2016 Summer Paralympics
Athletes (track and field) at the 2020 Summer Paralympics
Medalists at the 2016 Summer Paralympics
Medalists at the 2020 Summer Paralympics
Paralympic bronze medalists for China
Paralympic silver medalists for China
Paralympic gold medalists for China
Chinese female sprinters
Chinese female long jumpers
World Para Athletics Championships winners
Paralympic medalists in athletics (track and field)
Paralympic athletes of China
20th-century Chinese women
21st-century Chinese women